The 2015 Queensland Firebirds season saw the Queensland Firebirds netball team compete in the 2015 ANZ Championship. With a team coached by Roselee Jencke, captained by Laura Geitz and featuring Romelda Aiken, Clare McMeniman and Kim Ravaillion, Firebirds won the Australian Conference, the Challenge Trophy, the minor premiership and the overall championship. Firebirds narrowly defeated New South Wales Swifts in both the Australian Conference final and the Grand Final on their way to effectively winning four titles.

Players

Player movements

2015 roster

Notes
  Mahalia Cassidy, Laura Clemesha, Beryl Friday, Laura Scherian and Verity Simmons were all members of the 2015 Queensland Fusion squad. Jenny Brazel was the Fusion head coach.

Debutants
 Mahalia Cassidy made her ANZ Championship debut in the Round 8 match against Waikato Bay of Plenty Magic.

Milestones
 Romelda Aiken and Rebecca Bulley both made their 100th ANZ Championship appearance in the Round 1 match against West Coast Fever.
 Laura Geitz made her 100th ANZ Championship appearance in the Round 5 match against New South Wales Swifts.
 Romelda Aiken scored her 4,000 ANZ Championship goal in the Round 10 match against West Coast Fever.

Gold medallists
Rebecca Bulley, Laura Geitz and Kim Ravaillion were all members of the Australia team that won the gold medal at the 2015 Netball World Cup.  Geitz also captained Australia during the tournament.

Constellation Cup
On 22 October 2015, during the second test of the 2015 Constellation Cup series against New Zealand, for the first time in the history of the Australia national netball team, five Queensland Firebirds players were on the court at the same time. The five were Laura Geitz, Clare McMeniman, Gretel Tippett, Kim Ravaillion and Gabi Simpson.

Summer Shootout
Between 6 and 8 February, New South Wales Swifts hosted the Summer Shootout at Netball Central, Sydney Olympic Park. All ten ANZ Championship teams participated in the three-day tournament. A total of 25 games, consisting of both full length and shortened games consisting of two 15-minute periods, were played over the weekend. Firebirds finished the weekend with four wins and one defeat.

Regular season

Fixtures and results
Round 1

Round 2

Round 3

Round 4
 received a bye.
Round 5

Round 6

Round 7

Round 8

Round 9

Round 10

Round 11

Round 12

Round 13

Round 14

Final standings

Challenge Trophy
The 2015 season saw the introduction of the Ranfurly Shield-style, Challenge Trophy. The trophy was available to win every time the holder played at home. Once a visiting team defeats the title holders, the trophy is theirs to protect and hold against all challengers in every home game during the regular season until they are beaten. A pre-season draw saw West Coast Fever declared the inaugural holder. Fever subsequently enjoyed a nine-game unbeaten run in the league. They retained the Challenge Trophy until Round 10 when they were defeated 56–48 by Queensland Firebirds. Firebirds defended the trophy in Round 11 against Melbourne Vixens and in Round 14 against Southern Steel, finishing the season as trophy holders.

Finals

Conference Final

Semi-finals

Grand Final

Award winners

Mission Queensland Firebirds Awards

Notes
  Romelda Aiken and Kim Ravaillion shared the award.

ANZ Championship awards

All Star Team

Australian Netball Awards

Gallery

References

Queensland Firebirds seasons
Queensland Firebirds